The N. Eldon Tanner Building, also known as the TNRB, is a building that houses classrooms and administrative offices for the Marriott School of Business on the Brigham Young University (BYU) campus in Provo, Utah, United States.

Background
On March 18, 1980, during a devotional assembly, BYU president Dallin H. Oaks announced a decision by the Board of Trustees to construct a new campus management building that would be named in honor of N. Eldon Tanner, a Canadian politician and counselor to four presidents of the Church of Jesus Christ of Latter-day Saints. Administrators say that the business school's main building was named after Tanner because he was known in Canada as "Mr. Integrity" — a title wished upon every Marriott School graduate.

The Tanner Building was completed in late 1982 and dedicated on April 5, 1983, by Gordon B. Hinckley. Today, the seven-story,  granite building houses Marriott School classes, professors' offices and administration. A  addition, costing $43 million and funded by donations, was dedicated on October 24, 2008, by Thomas S. Monson.

Public suicide attempt
On December 3, 2018, around 9:00 a.m., a student publicly attempted suicide by jumping from the fourth floor of the Tanner Building atrium. The student was critically injured as a result of the fall and died two days later on December 5, 2018. The suicide attempt initiated campus-wide discussions about the availability of mental health resources on BYU campus. In response to the suicide, BYU bolstered mental health resources on campus and installed floor-to-ceiling glass walls along the perimeter of the atrium to prevent similar incidents from occurring.

See also
List of Brigham Young University buildings

References

External links

 Official website for the Marriott School of Management

University and college academic buildings in the United States
University and college administration buildings in the United States
Brigham Young University buildings
1983 establishments in Utah
School buildings completed in 1983